Neuhewen is a mountain in Baden-Württemberg, Germany.

External links
 

Mountains and hills of Baden-Württemberg